The Bull Hotel is a historic inn in Ludlow, at 14 Bull Ring.

The public house is described as "the best surviving medieval inn in Ludlow" and pre-dates the Feathers Hotel opposite. It is a Grade II listed building. Much of the current three-storey building dates to the 16th century, but the painted stucco front date from the 18th century and the roof tiles from the 20th century.

During the Ludlow Festival in the summer, the hotel hosts the Fringe Festival, featuring live jazz music and plays in the courtyard of the hotel.

Rivalry with The Feathers
On the opposite side of the street is the Feathers Hotel and the two hostelries partake in a tug-of-war competition every Boxing Day across the street itself.

See also
Listed buildings in Ludlow (northern area)

References

External links
Official site

Buildings and structures in Ludlow
Hotels in Shropshire
Grade II listed pubs in Shropshire
Grade II listed hotels